Afşar is a surname derived from Turkish. It has several variants such as Afshar and Avşar. People with the surname include:

 Amīr Aṣlān Afshār (1919–2021), Iranian diplomat and politician
 Amir Khosrow Afshar (1919–1999), Iranian diplomat and former foreign minister
 Ebrahim Afshar (died 1749), Shah of Persia during the Afsharid Empire 
 Esin Afşar (1936–2011), Turkish singer and stage actress
 Haleh Afshar, Baroness Afshar (1944–2022), Iranian British life peer in the House of Lords
 Hamid Ullah Afsar (1895–1974), Indian Urdu poet and writer
 Hoda Afshar (born 1983), Iranian-Australian photographer and artist
 Hülya Avşar (born 1963), Turkish actress, singer, and businesswoman
 Iraj Afshar (1925–2011), Iranian historian and scholar
 Jamshid Afshar, Iranian fighter pilot
 Kamran Afshar Naderi (born 1959), Iranian architect
 Kerim Afşar (1930–2003), Turkish actor
 Mahnaz Afshar (born 1977), Iranian actress
 Nader Shah Afshar (1688-1747), Shah of Iran, founder of an Iranian empire and the Afsharid dynasty
 Nazak Afshar, French-Iranian woman imprisoned in Iran
 Shahriar Afshar (born 1971), Iranian-American physicist

See also
 Afşar (disambiguation)

References

Surnames of Turkish origin
Surnames of Iranian origin